The June 1875 West Suffolk by-election was fought on 16 June 1875.  The by-election was fought due to the death of the incumbent Conservative MP, Lord Augustus Hervey.  It was won by the Conservative candidate Fuller Maitland Wilson.

References

1875 elections in the United Kingdom
1875 in England
West
June 1875 events